Carl August Wegner is a South African rugby union player for Benetton in the Pro14. His usual position is lock.

In 2011 Wegner played for the South Africa Under 20 team.

References

External links
It's Rugby England Profile

Living people
1991 births
South African rugby union players
Free State Cheetahs players
Cheetahs (rugby union) players
Rugby union locks
People from Ficksburg
Alumni of Grey College, Bloemfontein
South Africa Under-20 international rugby union players
South African expatriate rugby union players
South African expatriate sportspeople in France
Expatriate rugby union players in France
Stade Français players
Toyota Verblitz players
Benetton Rugby players
Rugby union players from the Free State (province)